Arinagour ("shieling of the goats") is a village on the island of Coll, in the Argyll and Bute council area of Scotland. It is the main settlement on the island, and is the island's ferry terminal. A ferry operated by Caledonian MacBrayne crosses to Oban and Tiree daily, extending once a week to Castlebay on Barra. It has a population of around 50. In 1961 it had a population of 54.

References 

Villages on Coll